Owen Davidson and John Newcombe were the defending champions, but competed this year with different partners. Davidson teamed up with Ken Rosewall and lost in second round to Anand Amritraj and Vijay Amritraj, while Newcombe teamed up with Tony Roche and lost in semifinals to tournament runners-up Patricio Cornejo and Jaime Fillol.

Bob Lutz and Stan Smith won the title by defeating Patricio Cornejo and Jaime Fillol 6–3, 6–3 in the final.

Seeds
Some seeds received a bye into the second round.

Draw

Finals

Top half

Section 1

Section 2

Bottom half

Section 3

Section 4

External links
 ATP main draw
1974 US Open – Men's draws and results at the International Tennis Federation

Men's Doubles
US Open (tennis) by year – Men's doubles